Fansipan (Vietnamese: Phan Xi Păng) is a mountain in Vietnam. It is the highest mountain in the Indochinese Peninsula (comprising Vietnam, Laos, and Cambodia), hence its nickname "the Roof of Indochina". Administratively, it is shared between Tam Đường district, Lai Châu and Sa Pa town, Lào Cai.

Etymology

The origin of the name Phan Xi Păng is unclear. The most accepted theory is that it evolved from Hủa Xi Pan (the tottering giant rock) – the name that the locals called the mountain based on its shape. Another theory suggested that the name came from the Hmong people, as it means Azalea Mountain in their language due to the prevalence of azalea and other species of Rhododendron genus on the mountain.

It has also been suggested that the name could have derived from Phan Văn Sơn, a geography official in the Nguyễn dynasty who helped the French to map the area and define the border with China in 1905. Due to the inaccurate local pronunciation, the name generally evolved into Phan Xi Păng.

Geography
Fansipan is the tallest mountain in the Hoang Lien Son Range, situated on the border of Lào Cai Province and Lai Châu Province with its peak located on the Lào Cai side. The mountain is part of the Hoàng Liên National Park.

Geology
Fansipan was formed around 250–260 million years ago, between the Permian period in the Paleozoic era and the Triassic period in the Mesozoic era. The Himalayan orogeny since Late Mesozoic has further uplifted Fansipan and the Hoang Lien Son Range and created the Red River Fault to the east.

Summit mark 
The initial metal pyramid was made and installed here by Soviet engineers from Hòa Bình in 1985. The amateur mountaineering expedition was the first one since the end of the colonial period and was officially timed to the 40th anniversary of the Victory Day of the Soviet Union over Nazi Germany.

Climbing

Hiking
Fansipan can be climbed in a steep and fairly strenuous hike. Previously, it took about 5–6 days from Sa Pa to reach Fansipan peak and return. Now the total time is usually only about three days, even two days, or for experts and strong, healthy people, it can be done in one day.

Tour companies in the area will arrange hikes to the summit taking from one to three days. Most recommend taking the two or three-day options, and few guides will take tourists on a round trip in a single day.

A very small village is located at around  where accommodation and food is offered. Most booked trips include the use of these facilities in their price should they be required.

Cable car

A cable car to the peak of Fansipan was inaugurated on February 2, 2016. The gondola lift departs from a terminal in Muong Hoa Valley near Sa Pa and takes 20 minutes to arrive at the summit. The service holds two Guinness World Records for the longest non-stop three-rope cable car in the world, spanning , and the greatest elevation difference by a non-stop three-roped cable car for the  difference in elevation between the termini.
Currently, there are also climbing trains that help climbers get past the walking stairs. Round-trip cable fare is VND 850,000 and round-trip climbing train is VND 150,000. There are discounts for students.

See also
 List of Southeast Asian mountains
 List of Ultras of Southeast Asia
 List of elevation extremes by country

References

Mountains of Vietnam
Landforms of Lào Cai province
Tourist attractions in Lào Cai province
Highest points of countries